The Battle of the Gediz was fought between the Turkish Kuva-yi Milliye forces and the Greek forces near the Gediz River in the city of Gediz. The Turkish forces attacked Gediz in order to find out if a force composed mainly of irregular forces could compete with the Greek army in a larger battle. The battle also showed that the irregular forces lacked discipline and experience; they had little chance in open field battles against the Greeks. The experiences gained in this battle led the Turkish provisional Government of the Grand National Assembly to the conclusion that it would be necessary hence forward to establish and fight with a regular army against the Greek army instead of irregular forces.

References 

Battles of the Greco-Turkish War (1919–1922)
Conflicts in 1920
1920 in Greece
1920 in the Ottoman Empire
Battles involving Greece
October 1920 events
November 1920 events